Combinatorial number theory deals with number theoretic problems which involve combinatorial ideas in their formulations or solutions. Paul Erdős is the main founder of this branch of number theory. Typical topics include covering system, zero-sum problems, various restricted sumsets, and arithmetic progressions in a set of integers. Algebraic or analytic methods are powerful in this field.

In combinatorial number theory, the barycentric-sum problems are questions that can be answered using combinatorial techniques. The context of barycentric-sum problems are the barycentric sequences.

Example

Let  be the cyclic group of integers modulo n.
barycentric-sum if it contains one element  such that .

Informally, if  contains one element , which is the ”average” of its terms. A barycentric sequence of length  is called a t-barycentric sequence. Moreover, when S is a set, the term barycentric set is used instead of barycentric sequence. For example, the set {0,1,2,3,4}   is 5-barycentric with barycenter 2, however the set  {0,2,3,4,5}  is not 5-barycentric. The barycentric-sum problem consist in finding the smallest integer t such that any sequence of length t contains   a k-barycentric sequence for some given k. The study of the existence of such t related with k and the study of barycentric constants are part of the barycentric-sum problems. It has been introduced by Ordaz, inspired in a theorem of Hamidoune: every sequence of length  in  contains a k-barycentric sequence. The zero-sum problem on sequences started in 1961 with the Erdős, Ginzburg and Ziv theorem: every sequence of length  in an abelian group of order n, contains an n-subsequence with zero-sum.

Barycentric-sum problems have been defined in general for finite abelian groups.

The barycentric constants introduced by Ordaz are: k-barycentric Olson constant, k-barycentric Davenport constant, barycentric Davenport constant, generalized barycentric Davenport constant, constrained barycentric Davenport constant. This constants are related to the Davenport constant i.e. the smallest integer t such that any t-sequence contains a subsequence with zero-sum. Moreover, related to the classical Ramsey numbers, the barycentric Ramsey numbers are introduced. An overview of the results computed manually or automatically are presented. The implemented algorithms are written in C.

References

External links 
Divulgacions Matemáticas (Spanish)

Combinatorics